The Voice of Africa is the ninth studio album by South African singer Kelly Khumalo. It was released on October 9, 2020, by Universal Music. It was produced by Mondli Ngcobo.

The album was certified gold in South Africa.

Background 
On February 13, 2020, Kelly announced that she had started recording her ninth studio album on her Instagram  account.

Singles 
"Empini" was released as album's lead single on June 19, 2020, as well as accompanying music video. The song peaked number one on South Africa Afro Pop Music charts.

"Esiphambanweni" featuring Hlengiwe Mhlaba was released on September 11, 2021, as the third single, peaked number one on South Africa Gospel charts.

Commercial performance 
The Voice of Africa (TVOA) was certified gold in South Africa on May 20, 2021. 

The album tracks "Empini" 4× platinum, "Esiphambanweni" 2× platinum, and "Ngathwala Ngaye" certified platinum.

Track listing

Accolades 
The Voice of Africa was nominated for Best Afro Pop Album at the 27th South African Music Awards.

|-
|2021
|The Voice of Africa
|Best Afro Pop Album
|

Personnel  
Credits for The Voice of Africa are adapted from AllMusic.
 Asanda Mvana  - composer, producer 
 Kelly Khumalo - vocals, composer 
 Nduduzo Makhathini - producer
 Mondli  Ngcobo - composer, producer 
 Hubert Batundi Muisha - producer

The Voice of Africa (Live)

The Voice of Africa is a live album by South African singer Kelly Khumalo. It was recorded at Ster Kinekor, Rosebank in November 2021.

The album incorporated elements of maskandi and traditional folk music, and gospel.

Track listing

Certifications and sales

Release history

References 

2020 albums
Universal Records albums